"The Gospel According to Luke" is a song co-written and recorded by American country music artist Skip Ewing. It was released in February 1989 as the fourth single from the album The Coast of Colorado.  The song reached number 10 on the Billboard Hot Country Singles & Tracks chart.  The song was by Ewing and Don Sampson.

Content
The song is about a young man who meets a homeless man named Luke. Despite his haggard appearance, strong odor from not having bathed or showered, and rough voice, he is adept at interpreting and preaching the Bible, particularly Gospel of Luke in the New Testament. The man offers to buy Luke breakfast, to which he is thankful.

A few days later, the two meet again, this time at a mission. Luke is seen giving the meager change he had collected during the past week, explaining that the needs of the mission and helping others were more important than his own wants or needs. In essence, the young man had witnessed a modern-day version of the lesson of the widow's mite (as told in both Luke 21:1-4 and Mark 12:41-44), where an elderly widow gives two mites -- the smallest Roman coin, implied to be her entire net worth -- to the offering and that the giving was in true sacrifice.

Chart performance

References

1989 singles
Skip Ewing songs
Songs written by Skip Ewing
Songs written by Don Sampson
Song recordings produced by Jimmy Bowen
MCA Records singles
1988 songs